The 2011 Eastern Creek Six Hour was an endurance motor race for production cars, held on 11 December 2011, at Eastern Creek Raceway in Sydney, New South Wales, Australia. It was Round 5 of the 2011 Australian Manufacturers' Championship, Round 5 of the 2011 Australian Production Car Championship, Round 3 of the 2011 Australian Endurance Championship and Round 2 of the 2011 Australian Production Car Endurance Championship. The race was originally to be run over an eight-hour duration, but this was reduced to six hours shortly before the event was run.

The race was won by the BMW 335i of Chaz Mostert and Nathan Morcom and was the only round of the 2011 Australian Manufacturers' Championship not won by Stuart Kostera.

Class Structure
 Class A – Extreme Performance
 Class B – High Performance
 Class C – Performance Touring
 Class D – Production Touring
 Class E – Compact Touring
 Class I – Invitational

Results
Results were as follows:

See also
2010 Eastern Creek 8 Hour Production Car Race
Motorsport in Australia

References

Australian Manufacturers' Championship
Australian Production Car Championship
Eastern Creek Six Hour
Motorsport at Eastern Creek Raceway